Bradford is a village and former civil parish, now in the parish of Adderstone with Lucker, in the county of Northumberland, England. It is situated to the south-west of Bamburgh, a short distance inland from the North Sea coast. In 1951 the parish had a population of 14.

History 
The name "Bradford" means 'Broad ford'. Bradford was formerly a township in the parish of Bambrough, from 1866 Bradford was a civil parish in its own right until it was abolished on 1 April 1955 to form Adderstone with Lucker.

Governance 
Bradford is in the parliamentary constituency of Berwick-upon-Tweed.

References

External links

Villages in Northumberland
Former civil parishes in Northumberland